Otto Hantschick (11 February 1884 – 22 November 1960) was a German international footballer.

References

1884 births
1960 deaths
Association football defenders
German footballers
Germany international footballers